Day of Redemption is a business-themed romantic drama film directed by Lawrence Lau (the Lee Rock series, starring Andy Lau, and Queen of Temple Street) and starring Vic Chou (aka Zai Zai, a member of the popular Taiwanese group F4), Tong Yao, Cao Yunjin, and Bai Yu. The film was co-financed by Gehua Cultural Development Group, Beijing's cable company, and Palette Pictures LLC.

Day of Redemption tells the story of the beautiful entrepreneur Zhou Ting, a young and pretty entrepreneur that fights to protect her lingerie business from a hostile takeover from her former college sweetheart, now an ambitious businessman. But as his rich, jealous girlfriend takes part in the dispute, the two former lovers reignite their old flame.

The movie was theatrically released on July 19, 2013, in mainland China, nationwide. YNET.com points that more theaters had to play the film just to accommodate the audience, and considered Day of Redemption the first high concept movie of mainland China, connecting the U.S. education received by the film's producer, writer, and director to its success. Netease Entertainment also deemed the movie "high concept", and Ye Qianyun and Tong Yao's performances were praised. China's CCTV, that broadcasts to about 1 billion people, rated Day of Redemption "intense", and "delighting"

Day of Redemption's online release on Tencent Video, a major Chinese video portal, has received more than 14 million views.

References

2013 films
2013 romantic drama films